Idrus bin Azizan Harun (Jawi: إدروس بن عزيزان هارون; born 2 February 1955) is a Malaysian lawyer who has served as the ninth Attorney General of Malaysia since March 2020.

Early life and education 
Idrus was born in Kampung Sanglang, Kedah in 1955. He attended to Ayer Hitam Secondary School and Kolej Sultan Abdul Hamid. He obtained a bachelor's degree in law in honours from University of Malaya in 1980.

Career 
Following his graduation from University of Malaya in 1980, Idrus started his career as a lawyer. He served as the senior registrar of the Kuala Lumpur High Court, Judge of the Sessions Court in Kota Kinabalu, deputy public prosecutor in Attorney General Chambers, legal advisor to the Terengganu state government,  Kerajaan Negeri Terengganu, Senior Federal Counsel in Malaysian Anti-Corruption Commission (BPR) and legal advisor to the Election Commission.

In 2014, Idrus was appointed a judge of the Court of Appeal and served till he was newly appointed a judge of the Federal Court on 28 November 2018. On 6 March 2020, he was appointed Attorney General, with 2-year term until 2022. His appointment was in order to fill the vacancy due to the resignation of Tommy Thomas.On 3 March 2023, his term as the Attorney-General was extended for six more months and set to expire on 6 September 2023.

Personal life 
Idrus is from a family with nine children of Kedah, exactly in Kampung Sanglang, Ayer Hitam. His father was the village head whereas his mother was a housewife. Idrus is also the elder brother to former Speaker of the Dewan Rakyat, Azhar Azizan Harun. His friends described him as "village boy" for being educated at Malay schools.

Honours

Honours of Malaysia
  :
  Commander of the Order of Meritorious Service (PJN) – Datuk (2007)
  Commander of the Order of Loyalty to the Crown of Malaysia (PSM) – Tan Sri (2014)
  Commander of the Order of the Defender of the Realm (PMN) – Tan Sri (2020)
  :
  Grand Knight of the Order of the Crown of Pahang (SIMP) – Dato' Indera (2008)
  Grand Knight of the Order of Sultan Ahmad Shah of Pahang (SSAP) – Dato' Sri (2013)
  :
  Knight Commander of the Order of the Crown of Terengganu (DPMT) – Dato' (1997)
  Knight Grand Commander of the Order of the Crown of Terengganu (SPMT) – Dato' (2014)
  :
  Knight Companion of the Order of Loyalty to the Royal House of Kedah (DSDK) – Dato' (2007)

References 

1955 births
Living people
People from Kedah
Knights Commander of the Order of the Crown of Terengganu
Knights Grand Commander of the Order of the Crown of Terengganu
Commanders of the Order of Meritorious Service
Commanders of the Order of Loyalty to the Crown of Malaysia
Commanders of the Order of the Defender of the Realm